Sachin Anil Punekar is an Indian botanist and ornithologist and founder President of Biospheres, a non-government organisation working for conservation of biodiversity. He has so far described more than 20 new plant taxa to the science. He did his PhD on 'Flora of Anshi National Park, Karnataka State' from Botanical Survey of India. He is working at Agharkar Research Institute, Pune.

Publications

References

External links 
 biospheres

Botanists active in India
Indian ornithologists
Living people
20th-century Indian botanists
Marathi people
20th-century Indian zoologists
Year of birth missing (living people)